Plaza Mexico is a bullring in Mexico City, Mexico.

Plaza Mexico (Mexico Square) may also refer to:

Austria
 Mexikoplatz in Vienna
Ethiopia
 Mexico Square in Addis Ababa
Philippines
 Plaza Mexico (Manila) in Intramuros, Manila
USA
 Plaza México (Lynwood, California)

See also
 Plaza de España